The Roman Catholic Diocese of Uvira is a diocese located in the city of Uvira  in the Ecclesiastical province of Bukavu in the Democratic Republic of the Congo.

History
 16 April 1962: Established as Diocese of Uvira from Metropolitan Archdiocese of Bukavu and Diocese of Kasongo

Leadership
 Bishops of Uvira (Latin Rite), in reverse chronological order
 Bishop Sébastien Muyengo Mulombe (since 15 October 2013)
 Sede vacante (1 August 2008 - 14 October 2013)
 Bishop Jean-Pierre Tafunga Mbayo, S.D.B. (10 June 2002 - 31 July 2008), appointed Coadjutor Archbishop of Lubumbashi
 Bishop Jérôme Gapangwa Nteziryayo (1 July 1985 – 10 June 2002)
 Bishop Léonard Dhejju (26 March 1981 – 2 July 1984), appointed Bishop of Bunia
 Bishop Danilo Catarzi, S.X. (16 April 1962 – 26 March 1981)

See also
Roman Catholicism in the Democratic Republic of the Congo

External links
 GCatholic.org
 Catholic Hierarchy

Uvira
Roman Catholic dioceses in the Democratic Republic of the Congo
Christian organizations established in 1962
Roman Catholic dioceses and prelatures established in the 20th century
Roman Catholic Ecclesiastical Province of Bukavu